Geragathe was an inland town of ancient Bithynia inhabited during Byzantine times.

Its site is located north of İzmit in Asiatic Turkey.

References

Populated places in Bithynia
Former populated places in Turkey
History of Kocaeli Province
Populated places of the Byzantine Empire